The Kolkata Metro Line 4 or the Yellow Line, also known as the Noapara - Barasat Line of the Kolkata Metro in India is a  long metro route from Noapara to Barasat in North 24 Parganas, which is under construction. It is being built by RVNL. It will run mostly underground viaducts. It will run elevated until Jessore Road Station and then it goes underground towards Barasat metro station. It will have an interchange station at the NSCBI Airport with Kolkata Metro Line 6.

The line is targeted to open from Noapara to Airport in October 2023.

Stations
The stations of this corridor are:

Progress of Dum Dum Cantonment metro station

An amount of Rs 227 crore contract to build this station along with a mostly at-grade  section from the Bagjola Canal to the existing ramp of the Airport Circular Railway track was awarded to Senbo Engineering Limited all the way back in June 2011. Since then, the station’s civil structure has been built, but work for the at-grade track section could not be started due to land acquisition issues along the line’s proposed alignment. But the rehabilitation work has completed, and the work is going smoothly. Recently girders were placed over Eastern Railway tracks.

Project Development
The project will be completed in three phases. The first phase of work from Noapara to Biman Bandar is under progress. In the second phase work from Biman Bandar to New Barrackpore will be done and in the last phase from New Barrackpore to Barasat work will be done. But the development work from New Barackpore to Barasat got struck for the last eight years since it was sanctioned because of encroachments and the Airport Authority of India objected the elevated stretches from New Barrackpore to Barasat. Later, after objections from AAI, a decision was taken to convert this into an underground stretch. For this underground tunneling AAI has agreed to shift their fuel tanks, buildings and cables and the project is expected to be started from 2020.

The development of New Barrackpore to Barasat was supposed to go elevated to cut down the expenses, but the stretch was in doubt due to huge encroachment problem. But in February 2021, Prime Minister Narendra Modi gave his nod to construct this stretch underground, giving respite to thousands of families who were supposed to be evicted for the development of the elevated stretch.

Line 4 has been divided into three phases now. 
 Phase 1: Noapara - Biman Bandar (under construction)  
 Phase 2: Biman Bandar - New Barrackpore (construction has been started, tender floated by RVNL to carry out construction work)  
 Phase 3: New Barrackpore - Barasat (construction to begin soon)

See also
List of Kolkata metro stations
Kolkata Metro Rolling Stock
List of rapid transit systems
Trams in Kolkata
Kolkata Lightrail
Kolkata Monorail
Kolkata Suburban Railway

References

Kolkata Metro lines
Kolkata Metro
750 V DC railway electrification